Abyss & Apex Magazine (A&A) is a long-running, semi-pro online speculative fiction magazine. The title of the zine comes from a quote by Friedrich Nietzsche (1844-1900), "And if you gaze long into the abyss, the abyss gazes also into you." The stories and poetry therefore follow the pattern of "how would humans react?" if a new technology or a type of magic or supernatural power affected them.

Abyss & Apex publishes somewhat dark fiction, but not horror. Instead, Abyss & Apex publishes about fifty percent each fantasy and science fiction. The magazine was issued bimonthly until #13 and thereafter quarterly.

Subgenres 
Per Wendy S. Delmater, "A&A likes to show all the different things speculative fiction can be (except horror)." From their submissions page: "We look for the unique: stories that stand out in a genre that pushes the envelope of unusual. We take special delight in detailed world-building: we like slipstream, YA, hypertext fiction, dark fantasy, science fiction puzzle stories, magical realism, hard science fiction, soft science fiction, science fantasy, urban fantasy, military science fiction, ghost stories, space opera, cyberpunk, steampunk... there is very little we will not look at, although we have a severe allergy to zombies, elves, retold fairy tales, sports, westerns, vampires, and gratuitous sex and violence. We have no subject/topic preference, beyond a requirement that the work have a speculative element. We are happy to read stories that don't quite seem to fit elsewhere."

Abyss & Apex has therefore published a rather broad range of subgenres of both science fiction and fantasy, everything from hypertext science fiction to YA fantasy.

Past and present editors 
Abyss & Apex was founded by Carol Burrell, and published by Burrell under the ByrenLee Press imprint, Riverdale, New York. Elizabeth Bear was managing editor from the first issue (January/February 2003), to issue #7 (January/February 2004) with editor Leah Bobet, followed by Kathryn Allen (March/April 2004 #8), Aleta Daknis (to #16 October 2005). From issue #15 onward (January 2006) Wendy S. Delmater has been the managing editor; she also became publisher from #37 (January 2011) when the magazine moved to a WordPress format, via Abyss & Apex Publishing, Lexington, SC. Wendy S. Delmater continues as head editor. Poetry editors have included Robin Mayhall, Trent Waters, Stephen A. Wilson, and John C. Mannone. Since 2010 Abyss & Apex has had a flash editor, Jennifer Dawson, with a staff dedicated to this very short form of fiction. Over the course of their history there have been several assistant editors, most notably Rob Campbell (New Zealand) as science fiction editor and Jude-Marie Green as associate editor, and Tonya Liburd as senior editor – to date the genre's only Caribbean magazine editor.

New and contributing writers 
Twenty-five percent of the stories Abyss & Apex have published are first-time publications for their authors. Publication in Abyss & Apex also became a cover letter credit for writers that later went on to be well known. Among other well-known names, Abyss & Apex published early Aliette de Bodard,  Marie Brennan, Karl Bunker, Paul Carson, Rae Carson, J. Kathleen Cheney, N.K. Jemisin, Lisa Mantchev, Will McIntosh, Tony Pi, Mercurio D. Rivera, Lawrence M. Schoen, and Lavie Tidhar.

Abyss & Apex has a policy of trying to publish veteran science fiction and fantasy writers to put their up-and-coming new authors on the same Table of Contents with established people in the genre, thereby giving a boost to new careers.  Such authors include Barth Anderson,  Greg Beatty, C. J. Cherryh, Ian Creasey, Paul Di Filippo, Samantha Henderson, Matthew Kressel, Jay Lake, Richard A. Lovett, Tim Pratt, Cat Rambo, Ken Scholes, Justin Stanchfield, Bud Sparhawk, Michael Swanwick, and Rachel Swirsky.

Anthology 
A selection of fiction and poetry, predominantly from issues #15 to #27, was published in The Best of Abyss & Apex, Volume One (Hadley Rille Books, 2009) edited by Wendy S Delmater.

Awards and honors 
2015
 Abyss & Apex was nominated for a 2015 Hugo in the Best Semiprozine category.

2014
 "Principles of Entropy" by Shelagh M. Rowan-Legg was nominated for a 2014 Rhysling Award by the Science Fiction Poetry Association.

2013
 Year's Best SF (Gardner Dozois), honorable mentions for 2013: "The Artist, Deeply, Brushes" by Ken Altabef, "Luminous Fish Scanalyze My Name" by Paul Di Filippo and Damien Broderick, "The Shadow Artist" by Ruth Nestvold.
 Abyss & Apexs 4Q 2010 story, "Rumor of Wings" by Alter S. Reiss, was the featured story on the 12/5/13 Podcastle.

2012
 Year's Best SF (Gardner Dozois), honorable mentions for 2012: "Land of Fire & Ashes" by Colin P Davies, "Lace Downstairs" by Arkady Martine, "Aurum" by Genevieve Valentine.

2011
 Year's Best SF (Gardner Dozois), honorable mentions for 2011: "A New Bridge Across the Lethe" by Howard V. Hendrix, "Bots D'Amour" by Cat Rambo.

2010
 Year's Best SF (Gardner Dozois), honorable mentions for 2010: "Sunlight" by Kelly Dwyer, "Anything Chocolate" by Caren Gussoff, "Talking to Elephants" by Mary Anne Mohanraj, "Ice Moon Tale" by Eilis O'Neal, "Night of the Manticore" by Tony Pi, "High Art" by Alan Smale, "The Tortouous Path" by Bud Sparhawk, "Spirits in the Night" by Michael Swanwick, "The Monks of Udom Xhai" by Lavie Tidhar.

2009
 Year's Best SF (Gardner Dozois), honorable mentions for 2009: "Letter Found in a Chest Belonging to the Marquis de Montseraille Following the Death of That Worthy Individual" by Marie Brennan, "Mirror Girl" by Paul Carson, "A Hundredth Name" by Christopher Green, "East of Chula Vista" by Samantha Henderson, "In The Middle of Nowhere With Company" by Ruth Nestvold, "Rainbows and Other Shapes" by Patricia Russo, "No Cord or Cable" by Bud Sparhawk.
 Howard Hendrix's poem "Bumbershoot", published in 2009, won the 2010 Dwarf Stars Award (Best Poem of 10 lines or less) from the Science Fiction Poetry Association.
 "Incarnation in the Delta" by Richard Foss (Abyss & Apex, #29: First Quarter 2009) was on the Tangent Online Recommended Reading List for 2009.

2008
 "Snatch Me Another" by Mercurio D. Rivera (Abyss & Apex 1Q/08) was reprinted in Unplugged: The Web's Best Sci-Fi & Fantasy, 2008 edited by Rich Horton and made the Locus Recommended Reading list for 2008.
 Alan Smale's "Quartet, With Mermaids" and Joanne Steinwachs' "The Number of Angels in Hell" were given honorable mentions in Ellen Datlow's The Best Horror of the Year: Volume One
 Tony Pi's "Metamorphoses In Amber" was a 2008 Prix Aurora Awards Finalist for Best Short Form Work in English.
 Year's Best SF (Gardner Dozois), honorable mentions for 2008: "Quartet, with Mermaids" by Alan Smale, "Dancing For the Monsoon" by Aliette de Bodard, "Stories of the Alien Invasion" by Manek Mistry, "Metamorphoses in Amber" by Tony Pi.

2007
 Year's Best SF (Gardner Dozois), honorable mentions for 2007: "The Man Behind the Curtain" by Joseph Paul Haines,

2006
 Year's Best SF (Gardner Dozois), honorable mentions for 2006: "In the Season of Blue Storms" by Jude Marie Green, "New Spectacles" by Will MacIntosh, "Interfaith" by Lisa Mantchev, "All the Wonder in the World" by Lavie Tidhar.

2005
 "Prayer Causes Stars" was nominated for the 2006 Rhysling Award (short poem category) and won Third Place, Dwarf Stars contest, 2006
 Year's Best SF (Gardner Dozois) honorable mention for 2005: "Museum Beetles" by Simon Kewin.

2004
 "No Ruined Lunar City" (October 2004 #11) by Greg Beatty won the Rhysling Award (short poem category) in 2005.
 Year's Best SF (Gardner Dozois), honorable mentions for 2004: "Live from the Volgograd Blackout!" by Barth Anderson, "Those Boiled Bones" by Jay Lake.
 "Making a Sparrow", Abyss & Apex March/April 2004 was listed in the Honor Roll in The Year's Best Science Fiction and Fantasy for Teens, edited by Jane Yolen and Patrick Nielsen Hayden; Honorable Mention, The Year's Best Fantasy and Horror, edited by Ellen Datlow, Kelly Link & Gavin Grant.

External links 
 Abyss & Apex Magazine
 Announcing the 2014 Campbellian Anthology

 The 2010 Dwarf Stars Anthology and Award
 Tangent Online 2009 Recommended Reading List 
 Recommended reading list, Locus Magazine February 2009 issue
 Unplugged: The Web's Best Sci-Fi & Fantasy, 2008
 SFPA Rhysling Award Archive
 The Year's Best Fantasy and Horror by volume

Bimonthly magazines published in the United States
Online literary magazines published in the United States
Quarterly magazines published in the United States
Science fiction magazines published in the United States
Fantasy fiction magazines
Magazines established in 2003
Magazines published in South Carolina
Science fiction webzines